Muyezersky District is an administrative district (raion), one of the fifteen in the Republic of Karelia, Russia. It is located in the west of the republic. Its administrative center is the urban locality (an urban-type settlement) of Muyezersky. As of the 2010 Census, the total population of the district was 12,236, with the population of the administrative center accounting for 27.2% of that number.

Administrative and municipal status
Within the framework of administrative divisions, Muyezersky District is one of the fifteen in the Republic of Karelia and has administrative jurisdiction over one urban-type settlement (Muyezersky) and twenty-three rural localities. As a municipal division, the district is incorporated as Muyezersky Municipal District. The urban-type settlement of Muyezersky is incorporated into an urban settlement, while the twenty-three rural localities are incorporated into seven rural settlements within the municipal district. The urban-type settlement of Muyezersky serves as the administrative center of both the administrative and municipal district.

References

Notes

Sources

Districts of the Republic of Karelia
 
